Ronald Kogod Goldman (November 2, 1943 — November 13, 2013) was an American film producer and tennis player.

Raised in the Washington D.C. area, Goldman was an alumnus of Sidwell Friends School in Bethesda, Maryland. He played collegiate tennis for Georgetown University and was twice Eastern Intercollegiate singles champion. A top ranked player in the Middle Atlantic, he made regular appearances at the U.S. national championships during the 1960s.

Goldman, a law graduate, had executive producer credits on several 1970s blaxploitation films. This includes the film Brotherhood of Death for which he was very much the brainchild and in a bid to save money was able to recruit members of the Washington Redskins football team to act in the film. He ran KB Theatres (co-founded by his grandfather Fred Kogod) in Washington DC for many years, before the business was sold to investors in the 1990s.

Filmography

References

External links
 
 
 

1943 births
2013 deaths
American male tennis players
American film producers
Tennis people from Washington, D.C.
Georgetown Hoyas men's tennis players
Competitors at the 1969 Maccabiah Games
Maccabiah Games gold medalists for the United States
Maccabiah Games medalists in tennis
Jewish tennis players